Diuris aequalis, commonly called the buttercup doubletail, is a species of orchid which is endemic to New South Wales. It has two rolled leaves and spikes of two to five golden-yellow to orange flowers and is classified as "vulnerable".

Description
Flowering occurs between October and December, following which the leaves die back to be replaced prior to the next flowering.

Taxonomy and naming
Diuris aequalis was first formally described in 1876 by Robert D. FitzGerald from a previously unpublished description by Ferdinand von Mueller. The description was published in Fitzgerald's book, Australian Orchids. The specific epithet (aequalis) is a Latin word meaning "like", "same" or "uniform".

Distribution and habitat
Buttercup doubletail orchid occurs on the ranges and tablelands of New South Wales between Braidwood and the Kanangra-Boyd National Park where it grows in forest and low open woodland with a grassy understory, often on gentle slopes.

Conservation
Only about 200 individual plants of D. aequalis are known, mostly on roadsides and on agricultural land. It is listed as "Vulnerable" (VU) under the Australian Government Environment Protection and Biodiversity Conservation Act 1999 (EPBC Act). The threats to its survival include land clearing, grazing, road maintenance and illegal rubbish dumping.

It was one of the plants targeted in the 2015 Save a Species Walk.

References

aequalis
Orchids of New South Wales
Flora of New South Wales
Plants described in 1876